The Federal Bureau of Narcotics (FBN) was an agency of the United States Department of the Treasury, established in the Department of the Treasury by an act of June 14, 1930, consolidating the functions of the Federal Narcotics Control Board and the Narcotic Division. These older bureaus were established to assume enforcement responsibilities assigned to the Harrison Narcotics Tax Act of 1914 and the Jones–Miller Narcotic Drugs Import and Export Act of 1922.

Harry J. Anslinger was appointed its first commissioner by Secretary of the Treasury Andrew Mellon, his father-in-law, under President Herbert Hoover. Under Anslinger, the bureau lobbied for harsh penalties for drug usage. The FBN is credited for criminalizing drugs such as marijuana with the Marijuana Tax Act of 1937, as well as strengthening the Harrison Narcotics Tax Act of 1914. Even so, the main focus of the FBN was fighting opium and heroin smuggling. One instance against opium was the Opium Poppy Control Act of 1942. To that end the FBN over time established several offices overseas in France, Italy, Turkey, Beirut, Thailand and other hotspots of international narcotics smuggling. These agents (never totaling more than 17) cooperated with local drug enforcement agencies in gathering intelligence on smugglers and also made undercover busts locally. The work against heroin and opium was however hamstrung by US foreign policy considerations: during the Vietnam War for instance great importance was placed on investigating minor Vietnamese smugglers that could be connected to the resistance while investigations of large scale smugglers from the US ally Thailand were left unfinished.

Anslinger retired in 1962 and was succeeded by Henry Giordano, who was the commissioner of the FBN until it was merged in 1968 with the Bureau of Drug Abuse Control, an agency of the Food and Drug Administration, to form the Bureau of Narcotics and Dangerous Drugs, an agency of the United States Department of Justice. The BNDD was a predecessor agency of the current Drug Enforcement Administration (DEA).

Legal disputes 
In Bivens v. Six Unknown Named Agents, the Federal Bureau of Narcotics was sued for violating the 4th Amendment rights of Bivens, through the illegal search and seizure of drugs without a warrant.

See also

 Sherman v. United States: A U.S. Supreme Court case involving the Bureau.
 List of United States federal law enforcement agencies

Notes

Defunct agencies of the United States government
United States Department of the Treasury
Federal Bureau of Narcotics
Defunct federal law enforcement agencies of the United States
Drugs in the United States
Government agencies established in 1930
1930 establishments in the United States
1968 disestablishments in the United States
Government agencies disestablished in 1968